Regina Guimarães (born 1957, in Porto), also known as Corbe, is a Portuguese poet, playwright, stage director and lyricist. She lives and works with her partner, Sergei Saguenail Abramovici a.k.a. Saguenail, since 1975. The couple founded the publishing house Hélastre.

Regina Guimarães is a member of the band Três Tristes Tigres, writing all music lyrics. Her poetry has also been sung by the band Clã.

Guimarães' first book came out in 1979, and, despite an irregular publishing pace, she is revered as one of the most important living artists in Porto.

Works

Poetry
1979 – A Repetição (ed. Hélastre)
1980 – Abaixo da Banalidade, Abastança (ed. Hélastre)
1985 – Anelar, Mínimo (ed. &etc.)
1990 – O Extra-Celeste (ed. AEFLUP)
1990 – Múmia (ed. Hélastre)
1992 – Uma Árvore como se Fosse Uma Raínha (ed. author, Afrontamento)
1994 – Tutta (ed. Felício & Cabral)
2001 – Algum(ns) Texto(s) Avesso(s) à Ideia de Obra (in the anthology Vozes e Olhares no Feminino)
2002 – 9 Histórias a 4 Mãos e 7 Pés (ed. Campo Alegre)
2009 – Orbe (ed. Hélastre)
2009 – Lady Boom: As Raínhas/ Cantigas de Amigo (ed. Hélastre)
2010 – Caderno do Regresso (ed. Hélastre)

References

20th-century Portuguese poets
Portuguese theatre directors
Portuguese lyricists
Living people
People from Porto
1957 births
Portuguese women poets
Portuguese women dramatists and playwrights
21st-century Portuguese poets
20th-century Portuguese dramatists and playwrights
21st-century Portuguese dramatists and playwrights
21st-century Portuguese women writers
20th-century Portuguese women writers